J. Michael Davisson is an American politician and businessman serving as a member of the Indiana House of Representatives from the 73rd district. He assumed office on October 28, 2021, succeeding his father, Steve Davisson.

Education 
Dacisson graduated from Salem High School in Salem, Indiana and earned a Bachelor of Arts degree from Indiana University.

Career 
Davisson served in the United States Army for 17 years. Outside of politics, he operate Good Living Pharmacy. In October 2021, he was selected to succeed his father, Steve Davisson, in the Indiana House of Representatives. In February 2022, he declared his candidacy for Indiana's 9th congressional district in the 2022 election. In the May 2022 Republican primary, Davisson placed fifth in a field of nine candidates.

References 

Living people
Republican Party members of the Indiana House of Representatives
People from Salem, Indiana
Indiana University alumni
Year of birth missing (living people)
Candidates in the 2022 United States House of Representatives elections